BoOzy' OS and the Cristal Gem (also known as The Cristal Gem) (also known as La Gemme de Cristal) is a 2013 French animation short film based on the French animated television series BoOzy' OS, and directed, written, scored by and starring its creator J.K. Arsyn, going by the name of Ken Arsyn. It was produced by RED ƎYE Productions and co-produced and distributed by CreaSyn Studio.

The film was first released at the Annecy International Animated Film Festival on April 14, 2013. It was presented during the Dailymotion, Cartoon Network Studios and Annecy international event "+ de courts! Online animation film contest by Annecy", and arrived first.

The film title refers to the Annecy award named "the Annecy Cristal" (le Cristal d'Annecy).

Plot
BoOzy' OS, a muscular caveman, is seeking the "Cristal" of Annecy.

Themes
The film parodies video game characters such as Earthworm Jim, Sonic the Hedgehog, Doctor Robotnik and  Mario as well as animated Disney films like Aladdin, The Lion King and Beauty and the Beast. The Cristal Gem also heavily parodies most of J.K. Arsyn's movies, such as Cow Hard and Stop-and-Cop.

Cast
 J.K. Arsyn as BoOzy' OS / Mari' OS / OSmic the Hedgeh' OS / SkoOlet' OS / Rob' OSmic / PoOlet' OS (voice);
 Georges Colazzo as Victor Chai (voice).

Soundtrack 
Synth of Rage scored the film. The music, inspired by video game music (Streets of Rage, Sonic the Hedgehog, The Lost World: Jurassic Park and Donkey Kong Country), was composed by J.K. Arsyn and performed by Axel “XLR” Rock.

Track listing

References

External links
 
 

2013 films
2013 computer-animated films
2013 comedy films
2013 fantasy films
2013 independent films
2013 short films
2010s animated short films
2010s French animated films
2010s French-language films
2010s adventure comedy films
2010s parody films
French animated short films
French computer-animated films
French animated fantasy films
French parody films
Animated comedy films
Animated adventure films
Animated films about cavemen
Animated films about dinosaurs
Animated films set in France
Animated films based on animated series